Lush Ab-e Qalandarabad (also Romanized as Lūsh Āb-e Qalandarābād; also known as Lūsh Āb and Lūsh-e Qalandarābād) is a village in Qalandarabad Rural District, Qalandarabad District, Fariman County, Razavi Khorasan Province, Iran. At the 2006 census, its population was 102, in 26 families.

References 

Populated places in Fariman County